G2A.COM Limited (commonly referred to as G2A) is a digital marketplace headquartered in the Netherlands, with offices in Poland and Hong Kong. The site specializes in the resale of gaming products by the use of redemption keys. Other products sold on the site include software, prepaid activation codes, electronics, and merchandise. As of March 2020, G2A's site has over 20 million users.

History 
The company was established in 2010 as Go2Arena by Bartosz Skwarczek and Dawid Rożek in Rzeszów, Poland.

The G2A Marketplace was launched in 2014. G2A PAY, the site's online payment gateway, was introduced in January 2015. G2A would also partner with BitPay, a U.S.-based payment processing system for Bitcoin.

In 2016, G2A announced a partnership with WebMoney Japan. In July, G2A launched G2A Direct, a partnership program for video game developers and publishers. That December, G2A became the title sponsor of the Exhibition & Congress Center in the Subcarpathian Voivodeship of Poland, located next to Rzeszów International Airport, which would be renamed the G2A Arena.

In 2017, G2A and Microsoft announced that they would work together to use Azure cloud technology on the G2A marketplace.

In 2018, G2A integrated Nexmo's two-factor authentication API. In July, electronics and merchandise were introduced to the site.

G2A Dev Studio 
In 2015, G2A launched its first virtual reality application called G2A Land, a virtual amusement park. G2A Land would later launch on Oculus Rift in 2017, and in 2018, the app would change its name to Funland.

In 2016, G2A and MSI created Gotham VR, a virtual reality promotion for Batman v Superman: Dawn of Justice. In December of that year, G2A announced Blunt Force, a World War II-themed VR shooter game developed in collaboration with Mark Bristol.

In February 2018, G2A Dev Studio, which was responsible for VR projects, became an independent video game studio called Monad Rock.

Other ventures

Esports 
From 2014 to 2019, G2A would establish partnerships with esports teams, such as Cloud9, Natus Vincere, Virtus Pro, and Polish esports organization x-Kom AGO.

In August 2016, G2A announced a partnership with Sporting Clube de Portugal.

In May 2017, G2A organized a boot camp for Virtus.pro and Natus Vincere in Rzeszów, Poland. In addition to training sessions, there was also a show match between the teams. A meet and greet with fans also took place in Millenium Hall, one of Rzeszów's largest malls. Piotr "Izak" Skowyrski, a native esports commentator, hosted the meet and greet event and also commented on match streams.

The EU-based Team Atlantis would join in November 2019, while the Polish Illuminar Gaming and Arcane Wave joined in March 2020.

Controversies 
G2A has been subject to numerous controversies. Critics have labeled the website as a "grey marketplace", where users can resell keys bought at a lower price from one region to another at a much higher price. Many developers have called for their own games to be pirated because they make little to no money from G2A sales. In June 2016, tinyBuild's CEO, Alex Nichiporchik, accused G2A of allowing key resellers to resell fraudulently obtained game keys, costing the company US$450,000. Nichiporchik added that it felt pressured to participate in G2A's payment platform, which would take some of the sales revenue back to G2A, in exchange for rooting out fraud on its platform.

In 2017, the G2A Direct service was launched to allow developers to obtain revenue from G2A key sales. At that year's Game Developers Conference, Outbound sales specialist Marius Mirek attempted to address G2A's reputation only to be subjected to ridicule. G2A Direct was criticized for only allowing 10% from key sales to go to game developers.

Addressing G2A in 2018, Charlie Oscar owner Sergei Klimov countered that G2A was not at fault, but indie developers "mismanaging their keys". He would also claim that the nature of economics between Eastern European companies and those in Western Europe and North America is also an issue. Klimov said that just as retail boxes could be unsold, bundle keys could also remain unsold or unused, and that a site like G2A is inevitable to offload and resell them.

In 2019, G2A proposed the development of a "Key Blocker" tool, through which developers can block the sale of keys that have been issued through promotions and giveaways. G2A stated they would need at least one hundred developers to show support for creating the tool, but only 19 developers would register. Unknown Worlds Entertainment founder Charlie Cleveland condemned G2A for "put(ting) the impetus on developers to have to take action..., while G2A profits off gray-market sales and credit card fraud."

Riot Games sponsorship ban 
Riot Games banned G2A from sponsoring teams during the 2015 League of Legends World Championship, in response to a breach in Riot's terms of service where G2A was selling fully leveled accounts.

In 2016, INTZ's Gabriel 'Tockers' Claumann was fined over US$1,000 at Campeonato Brasileiro de League of Legends (CBLoL), for wearing a T-shirt with G2A's logo on the shoulder. Midway through the game, he was asked to apply masking tape over the logo and told he would be fined.

Gearbox partnership 
On April 3, 2017, Gearbox Publishing announced a partnership with G2A to sell collector's editions of Bulletstorm: Full Clip Edition. YouTube game critic John 'TotalBiscuit' Bain was critical of the promotion, citing G2A's negative press coverage and accusations against the company, and threatened to withhold covering Bulletstorm, or any other Gearbox game unless Gearbox canceled the deal. On 6 April 2017, one day before Bulletstorm: Full Clip Editions release, Gearbox published a list of ultimatums made together with Bain for G2A to accept, which focused on G2A Shield, an open API for game developers, and G2A's payment system. When G2A didn't respond, Gearbox ended its partnership.

Product key fraud 
Around June 2019, Unknown Worlds Entertainment accused the site of using promoted advertising in Google and other search engine results to promote sales of their games through G2A rather than other channels. They stated that they see no revenue from sales on G2A, and instead encouraged users to illegally download their games rather than purchase them on G2A. G2A countered these claims by proving that all of its keys were legitimate through previous programs, such as G2A Direct. G2A also asked developers to audit their keys, and guaranteed to pay the developers 10 times the value of any charge-backs resulting from problematic keys sold on G2A. Only two of them raised the issue: Unknown Worlds asserting $30,000 of chargebacks related to bad keys for Natural Selection 2 through G2A, and Wube Software for $6,600 of chargebacks for Factorio keys. In the case of Wube, G2A settled with the developers in May 2020 after confirming 198 keys were improperly purchased, settling for $39,600, tenfold the keys' cost.

References

External links 
 G2A.COM – Global Digital Marketplace
 G2A.CO – Official Corporate Website

Video game controversies
Video game websites
Financial technology companies
Online marketplaces of China
Companies of Hong Kong